Warren Keith Sinclair (9 March 1924 – 14 May 2014) was an international expert in radiation protection, science and medicine.

References

1924 births
2014 deaths
New Zealand physicists
Health physicists
New Zealand medical researchers
University of Otago alumni
Alumni of the University of London
University of Chicago faculty
Health Physics Society